Shahriar Manzoor is a Bangladeshi competitive programmer and computer scientist. He is a prominent problemsetter of UVa Online Judge. He is a judge of ACM-ICPC World Finals 2003–2018 and chief judge of National Programming Contest 2003 & 2004. He is also the judging director of ACM ICPC Dhaka Site 2004–2018 and chief judge of ACM ICPC Kuala lumpur Regional Contest 2010.

He took part in the ACM ICPC Dhaka Site in the year 1999 as a part of a team from BUET and his team stood third. He started the concept of arranging monthly contests in online judges. He has set around 400 problems in different online, national and international contests like ACM ICPC Asia Regional Contest in Bangladesh, Thailand, Malaysia and China.

References

Competitive programmers
1976 births
Living people